Royal Daffodil may refer to:-

SS Royal Daffodil, originally a Mersey ferry named Daffodil, gained the Royal prefix after the Zeebrugge Raid on 1918
MV Royal Daffodil (1939), a cross channel excursion boat built in 1939 and scrapped in 1967
 MV Royal Daffodil II a Mersey Ferry built in 1958 mentioned on "Mersey Ferry" page.
MV Royal Daffodil, a Mersey ferry built as MV Overchurch and renamed in 1998